Rytidosperma tenuius, or purplish wallaby grass, is an Australian species of wallaby grass found in south eastern Australia, usually on clay or sandy soils in the drier eucalyptus woodlands. The spikelets have a purple tinged margins when old. The specific epithet tenuius is  derived from the Latin for thin.

References

tenuius
Bunchgrasses of Australasia
Flora of the Australian Capital Territory
Flora of New South Wales
Flora of Queensland
Flora of Victoria (Australia)
Flora of South Australia
Poales of Australia